Book packaging (or book producing) is a publishing activity in which a publishing company outsources the myriad tasks involved in putting together a book—writing, researching, editing, illustrating, and even printing—to an outside company called a book-packaging company. Once the book-packaging company has produced the book, they then  sell it to the final publishing company.

In this arrangement, the book-packaging company acts as a liaison between a publishing company and the writers, researchers, editors, and printers that design and produce the book. Book packagers thus blend the roles of agent, editor, and publisher. Book-packaging is common in the genre fiction market, particularly for books aimed at preteens and teenagers, and in the illustrated non-fiction co-edition market.

Business model
Publishing companies use the services of book-packaging companies in cases where the publishing company does not have the in-house resources to handle a project. There are two main reasons that publishing houses hire a book-packaging company: labor-intensive books (books with many illustrations or photographs, books which require coordinating the input of several authors, or 'novelty' books, such as gardening books that contain seed packages) and series books (e.g., Nancy Drew, Sweet Valley High, Goosebumps, and the For Dummies series).

In many cases, the book is first conceived as a marketing concept, and a writer is then hired to write the book on a work for hire basis. In some cases, book packaging companies use a celebrity with a very marketable name as the credited author, while using a professional ghostwriter to do most of the writing, researching, and editing.

Book-packaging is a common strategy between smaller publishers in different territorial markets where the company that first buys the intellectual property rights, sells a package to other publishers and gains an immediate return on capital invested. The first publisher will often print sufficient copies for all territories and thereby obtain the maximum quantity discounts on the print run for all.

Remuneration and credit
While the book-packaging sector is little-known outside the publishing world, it provides employment to many freelance authors and illustrators, particularly for those willing to work as ghostwriters, without credit in the book. Most book packaging companies pay a flat rate for manuscripts ranging from several thousand dollars to $1 per word. However, most book packaging companies do not pay royalties, which means that even if a ghostwriter's novel becomes a bestseller, the writer will not receive additional payment.

Often, writers or creators working for book-packagers work anonymously as ghostwriters, under the book-packaging company name ("by our staff writers"), or under a pen name.  In some cases, a writer's work will be credited to someone else's name, such as a celebrity, who is paid to be listed as the credited author as a way of increasing sales.

See also
Stratemeyer Syndicate

References

External links
 
 

Book publishing
Writing